The Super Quartet Live at Sweet Basil is a live album by jazz pianist Mal Waldron featuring soprano saxophonist Steve Lacy recorded at Sweet Basil in New York City in 1987 and released on the Japanese Paddle Wheel label.

Reception
The Allmusic review by Henry M. Shteamer awarded the album 4 stars stating " Live at Sweet Basil is highly recommended as an introduction to both Waldron and Lacy, as these performances reveal the quirks of each of their styles in a peppy, yet very profound setting".

Track listing
All compositions by Mal Waldron except as indicated
 "What It Is" — 12:19 
 "Evidence" (Thelonious Monk) — 10:52 
 "Snake Out" — 15:21 
 "Let's Call This" (Monk) — 7:23  
Recorded at Sweet Basil in New York City on August 28 & 29, 1987

Personnel
Mal Waldron — piano
Steve Lacy — soprano saxophone
Reggie Workman — bass
Eddie Moore — drums

References

1987 live albums
Mal Waldron live albums
Steve Lacy (saxophonist) live albums